Underboss is a 1997 biographical book based on the life of Sammy "The Bull" Gravano. The book goes through Gravano's early life up to 1997, which does not cover his re-arrest. The book's author is Peter Maas, who also wrote the book The Valachi Papers. Although Peter Maas is the credited author, Gravano was interviewed multiple times to describe what happened in his life. The book is published by HarperCollins Publishing Company.

References

External links
Maas, Peter. Underboss. 1997. 
Booknotes interview with Maas about Underboss: Sammy The Bull Gravano's Story of Life in the Mafia, August 24, 1997.

Non-fiction books about Italian-American organized crime
Non-fiction books about gangsters
1997 non-fiction books
HarperCollins books
Works about the American Mafia